Cottonwood Lake may refer to:
 Cottonwood Lake, a lake in Hellyer County Park of San Jose, California
 Cottonwood Lake, a lake in Blue Earth County, Minnesota
 Cottonwood Lake, a lake in Cottonwood County, Minnesota
 Cottonwood Lake (Grant and Stevens counties, Minnesota)
 Cottonwood Lake, a lake in Lyon County, Minnesota
 Cottonwood Lake, a lake in Watonwan County, Minnesota
 Cottonwood Lake (Jefferson County, Montana), a lake in Jefferson County, Montana
 Cottonwood Lake (Park County, Montana), a lake in Park County, Montana
 Cottonwood Lake, a lake in Floyd Lamb Park at Tule Springs, Las Vegas, Nevada
 Cottonwood Lake (Clark County, South Dakota)
 Cottonwood Lake (Codington County, South Dakota)
 Cottonwood Lake (Jerauld County, South Dakota)
 Cottonwood Lake (Marshall County, South Dakota)
 Cottonwood Lake (Spink County, South Dakota)
 Cottonwood Lake (Sully County, South Dakota)